Quorn is a small town and railhead in the Flinders Ranges in the north of South Australia,  northeast of Port Augusta.

Quorn is the home of the Flinders Ranges Council local government area. It is in the state Electoral district of Stuart and the federal Division of Grey.

With its picturesque setting and heritage-listed buildings, the town is known for tourism and as a filming location, as well as being the terminus of the Pichi Richi Railway.

History 

The town was surveyed by Godfrey Walsh in 1878 and named after Quorndon in Leicestershire, United Kingdom, as part of the preparations for building the railway line from Port Augusta northwards.

The railway line from Port Augusta to Quorn opened in 1879 and was subsequently extended north to Government Gums (Farina) in 1882, Marree in 1884, Oodnadatta in 1890 and Alice Springs in 1929. This railway line later became known as the Great Northern Railway and later the Central Australia Railway.

In 1917, Quorn became the crossroads of any north–south (on the Central Australian Railway to Oodnadatta) or east–west travel in Australia, when the Trans-Australian Railway was completed between Port Augusta and Kalgoorlie. This made Quorn an important town, given that any person travelling east–west or north–south in Australia would need to pass through Quorn. As a result, many fine buildings were built as the town expanded.

Quorn's role as a crossroads was lost when a standard gauge railway connection was opened between Port Pirie Junction and Port Augusta in 1937, meaning east–west trains bypassed Quorn. However, during World War II, Quorn was a vital service point for trains heading north to Alice Springs and carried over 1,000,000 troops heading to Darwin and on to Papua New Guinea. Trains services through Quorn peaked at over 50 per day during and immediately after the period of World War II. Services during this time also included coal mined at Leigh Creek being moved to the newly opened Playford A Power Station in Port Augusta.

During the 1950s a new standard gauge line was built that passed on the western side of The Dutchmans Stern, Mount Arden and Mount Eyre, from Stirling North to Brachina and then roughly following the original narrow gauge route through Leigh Creek and to Marree, thus bypassing Quorn. This bypass took away the last railway traffic through the Pichi Richi Pass, and the last major freight traffic through Quorn. The only services left operating through Quorn were freight between Peterborough and Hawker. As a result, Quorn's importance diminished and eventually in 1980s the railway was completely closed as the last freight was moved to road transport. One unusual aspect of the railway working from Peterborough to Quorn and then on to Hawker was the need for the engine to be turned and attached to the opposite end of the train when arriving at Quorn, as it was not a "through" station for the trip from Peterborough to Hawker.

In 1973, a group of railway enthusiasts assembled with the desire to preserve the unique bridges and stone work built in the previous century that formed the railway through the Pichi Richi Pass between Quorn and Stirling North. Thus the Pichi Richi Railway Preservation Society was formed. Although the intention was to just preserve the railway through the Pichi Richi Pass, they later acquired operable railway rollingstock and locomotives and today provide a tourist railway service through the Pichi Richi Pass from Quorn to Port Augusta. There is at least one book by preservationists showing the line in its heyday.

Tourism

A main attraction in Quorn is the Pichi Richi Railway. There are also self-guided walking tours in the town, including several based around the town's historic old buildings, the railway yards and other historic locations.

Quorn recently installed signage outside the historic buildings for historic and tourist information. The Flinders Ranges Visitor Information Centre / Pichi Richi Railway in the Quorn railway station has a museum, and provides visitor information including workshop tours, bookings for travel on the railway, accommodation information, heritage self-guided walking maps and souvenirs.

There are a number of restaurants, bistro and cafes in town. at the hotels on Railway Terrace, (Transcontinental, Austral, Criterion Hotels) and cafe's including Teas on the Terrace and Quandong Café. Emilys Bistro in First Street is currently closed.

The Heysen Trail and the Mawson Trail, a pair of long-distance trails dedicated respectively to walking and cycling, pass through town and there are many bushwalks and four-wheel drive tracks.

Quorn is a stopover for many travellers coming from Adelaide to explore the Flinders Ranges. The tourist office is in the Quorn Railway Station provides free information, maps and trails to safely see the best sites in the Flinders, including Warren Gorge, Kanyaka Station, Proby's Grave and Itali Itali.

The grain silos in the Quorn railway yards are viewing area for a nightly film showing the local history or Quorn and surrounds and on display every evening after dark. This is an open-air and free event.

Quorn has also been the location for several popular films, including The Shiralee, Sunday Too Far Away, Gallipoli, Wolf Creek, The Sundowners, The Lighthorsemen and The Last Ride starring Hugo Weaving. In 2014 Russell Crowe directed The Water Diviner, using the Pichi Richi Railway for the railway scenes.

People
Quorn is home to country music artist Jedd Hughes
Birthplace of politician Brian Harradine
Birthplace of actress Anne Haddy
Birthplace of champion SANFL footballer Fos Williams
Former Australian of the Year, Lowitja O'Donoghue AC CBE, spent much of her childhood at the Colebrook Children's Home, an institution housing Aboriginal children run by the United Aborigines Mission
Quorn is also home to SES volunteer and cleaner, Jose Omonte-Estrada; he murdered two young women (one under the age of 18) in 2012.

Heritage listings

Quorn has a number of heritage-listed sites, including:
 Arden Vale Road: Mt Arden Station
 37 First Street: Savings Bank of South Australia, Quorn
 45-47 First Street: Foster's Store
 Quorn-Port Augusta Road: Woolshed Flat Railway Bridge
 Railway Terrace: Catholic Church of the Immaculate Conception, Quorn
 Railway Terrace: Quorn railway station
 20 (Rear) Railway Terrace: Quorn Institute
 2 Railway Terrace: Dunn's Flour Mill
 6 Railway Terrace: Bank of Adelaide, Quorn
 11 Railway Terrace: National Bank, Quorn
 14-15 Railway Terrace: Transcontinental Hotel, Quorn
 16 Railway Terrace Austral Hotel, Quorn
 17 Railway Terrace: Bruse's Hall
 18 Railway Terrace: Criterion Hotel, Quorn
 19 Railway Terrace: Quorn Courthouse
 20 Railway Terrace: Quorn Town Hall
 25 Railway Terrace: Grand Junction Hotel
 15 Seventh Street: St Matthew's Anglican Church, Quorn

Gallery

References

External links 

 SA History - Quorn
 A tale of two Quorns
 Pichi Richi Railway Website

Towns in South Australia
Flinders Ranges
Populated places established in 1878
1878 establishments in Australia
Far North (South Australia)